Hooters Air was an airline headquartered in Myrtle Beach, South Carolina, United States. Hooters Air flights were operated by Winston-Salem, North Carolina-based Pace Airlines both as ad hoc private charters, and as scheduled USDOT public charters. As such, flights operated both under Pace Airlines' IATA Code of Y5 for ad hoc charters, and under its own IATA Code of H1 for public charters.

History
The airline was established in 2003 and started operations on March 6, 2003. It was founded by Hooters of America restaurant owner Robert Brooks, who acquired Pace Airlines in December 2002. All flights were operated by Pace Airlines. Hooters Air was owned by Hooters of America, Inc. Brooks initially envisioned Hooters Air as an unconventional means of generating awareness for the Hooters restaurant brand; the carrier was sometimes referred to as a "flying billboard" for the restaurant chain.

Aside from its unorthodox neighborhood chain-restaurant tie-in, Hooters Air sought to differentiate itself from other carriers with a distinctive style of in-flight service. The carrier was marketed towards golfers in an effort to bring casual and tournament players to Myrtle Beach's 100+ championship golf courses. Two "Hooters Girls," dressed in their restaurant uniforms, were on each flight assisting the (traditionally attired) in-flight crews with hospitality duties. The company advertised nonstop flights for most routes, including slogans like "Fly a mile high with us." Although Hooters Air billed itself as a low-fare carrier, rows of seats were removed from the aircraft to provide a  seating pitch to all passengers, comparable to the legroom offered by many carriers' business classes; in keeping with the golf-friendly orientation of the carrier, this was called "Club Class" seating. Additionally, all seats were upholstered in dark blue or black leather, and all aircraft were painted in Hooters' orange and white company colors featuring the company logo, and mascot ("Hootie the Owl"),  on the vertical stabilizer. Also, at a time when many low-cost carriers were eliminating in-flight frills in an effort to curtail expenses, Hooters Air served complimentary meals to all customers on trips lasting over one hour.

On December 8, 2005, Hooters announced that it would end service to Rockford, Illinois on January 5, 2006, as a result of the airport authority's bringing in a competing airline (United Airlines) on its Rockford-Denver route, and providing revenue guarantees for the competitor.

All commercial services were suspended on January 9, 2006. Parent company Pace Airlines continued with charter services for another three years, ceasing operations in September 2009. On April 17, 2006, Hooters Air ceased operations, halting scheduled public charter service and refunding tickets. The company attributed this cessation of service primarily to a marked increase in fuel costs in the wake of Hurricanes Katrina and Rita in the autumn of 2005.

The airline is estimated to have cost Hooters of America $40 million.

Destinations

Destinations at closure
Service to the following airports ended on April 17, 2006.

United States
Florida
Fort Lauderdale - Fort Lauderdale–Hollywood International Airport
St. Petersburg/Clearwater - St. Petersburg–Clearwater International Airport
New Jersey
Newark - Newark Liberty International Airport
Pennsylvania
Allentown - Lehigh Valley International Airport
South Carolina
Myrtle Beach - Myrtle Beach International Airport

Destinations ended prior to closure

Bahamas
 Nassau - Lynden Pindling International Airport

United States
Colorado
Denver - Denver International Airport
Florida
Fort Myers - Southwest Florida International Airport
Orlando - Orlando Sanford International Airport (ended on March 26, 2006)
Georgia
Atlanta - William B. Hartsfield-Jackson Atlanta International Airport
Illinois
Rockford - Northwest Chicagoland International Airport
Indiana
Gary - Gary/Chicago International Airport
Maryland
Baltimore - Baltimore/Washington International Thurgood Marshall Airport
Nevada
Las Vegas - Las Vegas McCarran International Airport
Ohio
Columbus - Rickenbacker International Airport
Pennsylvania
Pittsburgh - Greater Pittsburgh International Airport
Wilkes-Barre/Scranton - Wilkes-Barre/Scranton International Airport (ended on March 26, 2006)
Puerto Rico
San Juan - Luis Muñoz Marín International Airport (SJU)
Texas
Houston - Houston-George Bush Intercontinental Airport

Fleet
 
The Hooters Air fleet consisted of the following aircraft (in 2006):
2 Boeing 737-200
4 Boeing 737-300
1 Boeing 757-200

See also
 List of defunct airlines of the United States

References

External links

 Hootersair.com archive

Hooters
Defunct airlines of the United States
Airlines established in 2003
Airlines disestablished in 2006
Myrtle Beach, South Carolina
Defunct companies based in South Carolina
2003 establishments in South Carolina
2006 disestablishments in South Carolina